Alby Stamp (26 December 1879 – 16 May 1971) was an Australian rules footballer who played for the Essendon Football Club in the Victorian Football League (VFL).

Notes

External links 
		

1879 births
1971 deaths
Australian rules footballers from Victoria (Australia)
Essendon Football Club players
People from Maryborough, Victoria